Oakhurst is a census-designated place and unincorporated community in San Jacinto County, Texas, United States. The population was 233 at the 2010 census. Prior to the 2010 census Oakhurst and Cape Royale CDPs were part of Oakhurst city, which has been disincorporated.

Geography
Oakhurst is located at  (30.740538, -95.310563).

Demographics
As of the census of 2000, there were 230 people, 85 households, and 66 families residing in the city. The population density was 146.5 people per square mile (56.6/km2). There were 115 housing units at an average density of 73.3/sq mi (28.3/km2). The racial makeup of the city was 84.78% White, 14.78% African American, and 0.43% from two or more races. Hispanic or Latino of any race were 3.04% of the population.

There were 85 households, out of which 32.9% had children under the age of 18 living with them, 64.7% were married couples living together, 10.6% had a female householder with no husband present, and 21.2% were non-families. 17.6% of all households were made up of individuals, and 7.1% had someone living alone who was 65 years of age or older. The average household size was 2.71 and the average family size was 3.06.

In the city the population was spread out, with 27.8% under the age of 18, 8.7% from 18 to 24, 19.1% from 25 to 44, 31.3% from 45 to 64, and 13.0% who were 65 years of age or older. The median age was 39 years. For every 100 females, there were 103.5 males. For every 100 females age 18 and over, there were 90.8 males.

The median income for a household in the city was $39,167, and the median income for a family was $40,909. Males had a median income of $31,875 versus $35,417 for females. The per capita income for the city was $15,987. About 5.0% of families and 17.8% of the population were below the poverty line, including 26.8% of those under the age of eighteen and 30.8% of those 65 or over.

Notable people
W. Marvin Watson, who served as U. S. Postmaster General, White House Appointments Secretary and then as White House Chief of Staff under President Lyndon B. Johnson, was born in Oakhurst in 1924.

Education
Oakhurst is served by the Coldspring-Oakhurst Consolidated Independent School District.

References

Former cities in Texas
Populated places disestablished in 2000
Unincorporated communities in Texas
Unincorporated communities in San Jacinto County, Texas
Census-designated places in San Jacinto County, Texas
Greater Houston
Census-designated places in Texas